Utah has the eleventh lowest per capita income in the United States of America, at $18,185 (2000).  Its personal per capita income is $24,977 (2003).

Utah counties ranked by per capita income

Note: Data is from the 2010 United States Census Data and the 2006-2010 American Community Survey 5-Year Estimates.

See also
 List of municipalities in Utah

References

United States locations by per capita income
Economy of Utah
Income